Isabel García Tejerina (Valladolid, 9 October 1968) is a Spanish politician of the PP.

Early life and education
García Tejerina has a Master's from University of California, Davis in Agricultural Economy, a Bachelor's in Law from the University of Valladolid and a degree in agricultural engineering from the Technical University of Madrid.

Political career
García Tejerina served as General Secretary of Agriculture and Feeding of Spain for two periods: from April 2000 to April 2004 and from February 2012 to April 2014. She was Spain's Minister of Agriculture, Fishers, Food and Environment from 28 April 2014 until 1 June 2018, when a vote of no-confidence against Mariano Rajoy ousted the government. Her re-appointment caused some criticism by Spanish environmentalists.

Other activities
 Iberdrola, Independent Member of the Board of Directors (since 2021)

References

1968 births
Agriculture ministers of Spain
Politicians from Castile and León
Living people
Members of the 12th Congress of Deputies (Spain)
Members of the 13th Congress of Deputies (Spain)
People from Valladolid
People's Party (Spain) politicians
Polytechnic University of Madrid alumni
Environment ministers of Spain
University of California, Davis alumni
University of Valladolid alumni
Women government ministers of Spain
Women members of the Congress of Deputies (Spain)
Members of the 14th Congress of Deputies (Spain)